Carlos A. Pagán González (born August 27, 1954) is a Puerto Rican politician and former senator. He served as a member of the Senate of Puerto Rico from 1997 to 2009, representing the New Progressive Party (PNP).

Early years and studies

Carlos A. Pagán González was born on August 27, 1954 in Mayagüez, Puerto Rico to Hilda González and Manuel Pagán Ramírez. He has a sister, called Carmen. Pagán finished his elementary and high school in Lajas. Then, he received a Bachelor's degree in Political Science, and a Master's degree in Criminal Justice and Public Administration. He achieved both degrees with magna cum laude honors from the Interamerican University of Puerto Rico.

Professional career

Pagán  has worked as Director of the Employment Rights Office in Lajas, as well as Regional Coordinator of Social Services of Mayagüez, and Regional Director of the Department of Natural and Environmental Resources. He has also worked as a History professor at the Interamerican University of Puerto Rico.

Political career

Pagán showed interest in politics since being a teenager. When he was 14 years old, he was President of the PNP Youth, and then became one of the youngest members of the Municipal Assembly.

In 1996, he was elected to the Senate of Puerto Rico for the first time, representing the District of Mayagüez. During that term, he presided the Commission of Natural Resources and Environmental Affairs, and was Vicepresident of the Commission of Employment and Veteran Affairs, among others.

Pagán lost the 2000 general elections, but was reelected again in 2004. He served as the Majority Whip of his party during this term.

Pagán presented his candidacy for the 2008 elections, but in the primaries of the party, Evelyn Vázquez narrowly defeated him, leaving Pagán out of the race. After that, Pagán has worked as a special aide to senator Norma Burgos.

Personal life

Pagán is married to Ramonita "Cuca" Pabón, who has a master's degree in Counseling and Rehabilitation.

References

External links

1954 births
People from Mayagüez, Puerto Rico
Living people
Members of the Senate of Puerto Rico
New Progressive Party (Puerto Rico) politicians